Colin Dean (1919-2007) was an Australian producer and director who worked in Australian TV in the 1950s and 1960s.

He worked in the UK in the late 1940s, and returned to Australia in the 1950s.

Select credits
The Queen in Australia (1954)
Lady in Danger (1959)
Stormy Petrel (1960) (TV series)
The Patriots (1962) (TV series)
The Case of Private Hamp (1962)
Flowering Cherry (1963)
The Long Sunset (1963)
The Hungry Ones (1963) (TV series)
The Purple Jacaranda (1964) (TV series)

References

External links

Obituary at Sydney Morning Herald
Interview with Colin Dean at ABC TV Gore Hill
Article on Dean's retirement at ABC TV Gore Hill

Australian directors
1919 births
2007 deaths
Australian film producers